Happy Birthday, Charlie Brown is a prime-time animated TV special based upon the comic strip Peanuts, by Charles M. Schulz. It was originally aired on the CBS network on January 5, 1979.

This episode celebrated the 30th anniversary of the Peanuts comic strip and the 15th anniversary of animated Peanuts specials on CBS, which both took place the following year, in 1980. It included an interview with Charles M. Schulz. Phyllis George hosted.

Voice actors
Arrin Skelley: Charlie Brown
Daniel Anderson: Linus Van Pelt
Annalisa Bartolin: Sally Brown
Bill Melendez: Snoopy & Woodstock
Michelle Muller: Lucy Van Pelt
Ronald Hendrix: Franklin
Laura Planting: Peppermint Patty
Casey Carlson: Marcie
Don Potter: Snoopy (singing voice)

Credits
Written, Produced and Directed by: Lee Mendelson
Animation by: Bill Melendez Productions
Animation Directors: Bill Melendez, Phil Roman
Cinematographers: David Crommie, Chuck Barbee, Stewart Barbee
Associate Producers: Martha Grace, Paul Preuss, Ron Nelson
Unit Production Manager/1st Assistant Director: Larry Sturhahn
Production Staff: Pat LaFortune, Margaret Howard
Editors: Paul Preuss, Chuck McCann
Sound Recordists: John Barbee, Nelson Stoll
Sound Recording/Mix: Producers' Sound Service - Hollywood
Camera Assistants: Elizabeth Barbee, Randall Love, George Stephenson, Joseph Ward
Production Coordinator: Glenn Mendelson
Assistant Editor: Michael Rosenthal
Voice Recording: Coast Recorders - San Francisco, California
"The Big Bow Wow" and "Suppertime" Sung by: Don Potter
"Happiness Is..." Sung by: Becky Reardon, Larry Finlayson
Hair Stylist: Barbara Lorenz
Makeup: Lona Mardock
Gaffer: Jeffrey Gilliam
Electrician: Leo Loverro
Props: John Durr
A Lee Mendelson Production
in association with Charles M. Schulz Creative Associates and Bill Melendez Productions
© Copyright 1978 by United Feature Syndicate, Inc.

References

External links
 

Peanuts television documentaries
Television shows directed by Phil Roman
1970s American television specials
1970s American animated films
CBS original programming
1979 television specials
1979 in American television
CBS television specials
1970s animated television specials
1979 documentary films